Alain Merchadier (born 13 March 1952) is a French retired professional football defender.

External links
 
 
Profile on French federation official site
Profile

1952 births
Living people
French footballers
France international footballers
Association football defenders
AS Saint-Étienne players
AS Nancy Lorraine players
Ligue 1 players
Footballers from Toulouse
Blois Football 41 players